This is a list of Ukrainian football transfers in the summer transfer window  2009  by club. Only transfers of the Premier League, 1st League and 2nd League are included.

Premier League

FC Arsenal Kyiv

In:
 

Out:

FC Chornomorets Odessa

In:
 

Out:

FC Dnipro Dnipropetrovsk

In:

Out:

FC Dynamo Kyiv

In:
 

Out:

FC Illichivets Mariupol

In:
 

Out:

FC Karpaty Lviv

In:

Out:

FC Kryvbas Kryvyi Rih

In:

 

Out:

FC Metalist Kharkiv

In:

Out:

FC Metalurh Donetsk

In:

Out:

FC Metalurh Zaporizhzhia

In:
 

 Chung-Ang University
Out:

FC Obolon Kyiv

In:
 

Out:

FC Shakhtar Donetsk

In:
 

Out:

SC Tavriya Simferopol

In:
 

Out:

FC Vorskla Poltava

In:

Out:

FC Zorya Luhansk

In:

Out:

FC Zakarpattia Uzhhorod

In:

  

Out:

First League

FC Desna Chernihiv

In:

Out:

FC Dniester Ovidiopol

In:

Out:

FC Dynamo-2 Kyiv

In:

Out:

FC Enerhetyk Burshtyn

In:
 

Out:

FC Feniks-Illychovets Kalinine

In:

 

Out:

FC Kharkiv

In:
 

Out:

FC Helios Kharkiv

In:
 

Out:

FC Ihroservice Simferopol

In:
 

Out:

FC Krymteplitsia Molodizhne

In:

Out:

FC Lviv

In:

Out:

FC Naftovyk-Ukrnafta Okhtyrka

In:

Out:

FC Nyva Ternopil

In:

Out:

PFC Olexandria

In:
 

Out:

FSC Prykarpattya Ivano-Frankivsk

In:
 

Out:

PFC Sevastopol

In:
 

Out:

FC Stal Alchevsk

In:

Out:

FC Volyn Lutsk

In:

Out:

Ukrainian Second League

Druha A

FC Arsenal Bila Tserkva

In:

Out:

FC Bastion Illichivsk

In:

Out:

FC Bukovyna Chernivtsi

In:

Out:

FC CSKA Kyiv

In:

Out:

FC Dnipro Cherkasy

In:
 

Out:

FC Karpaty-2 Lviv

In:

Out:

FC Knyazha-2 Schaslyve

In:

Out:

FC Korosten

In:

Out:

MFK Mykolaiv

In:

Out:

FC Nafkom Brovary

In:

Out:

PFC Nyva Vinnytsia

In:

Out:

FC Obolon-2 Kyiv

In:

Out:

FC Podillya-Khmelnytskyi

In:

Out:

FC Ros' Bila Tserkva

In:

Out:

FC Veres Rivne

In:

Out:

FC Yednist' Plysky

In:

Out:

Druha B

FC Arsenal Kharkiv

In:
 

Out:

FC Dnipro-75 Dnipropetrovsk

In:

Out:

FC Hirnik Kryvyi Rih

In:

Out:

FC Hirnyk-Sport Komsomolsk

In:

Out:

FC Illichivets-2 Mariupol

In:

Out:

FC Kremin Kremenchuk

In:

Out:

FC Metalurh-2 Zaporizhzhia

In:

Out:

FC Olkom Melitopol

In:

Out:

FC Olimpik Donetsk

In:

Out:

FC Poltava

In:

Out:

PFC Sevastopol-2

In:

Out:

FC Shakhtar Sverdlovsk

In:

Out:

FC Shakhtar-3 Donetsk

In:
 

Out:

FC Stal Dniprodzerzhynsk

In:
 

Out:

FC Titan Armyansk

In:

Out:

FC Titan Donetsk

In:

Out:

FC Sumy

In:

Out:

FC Zirka Kirovohrad

In:
 

Out:

See also
Ukrainian Premier League 2008-09
Ukrainian First League 2008-09
Ukrainian Second League 2008-09

References

External links
 Ukrainian Football Premier League- official site
 Professional football league of Ukraine – official site
 Football Federation of Ukraine  – official site
 Ukrainian Soccer Fan Club (ukrainiansoccer.net) – amateur's site
 UA:Football:News. Ukrainian Football

Ukrainian
Transfers
2009